The Wiley, Clark & Greening Bank, on Main St. in Ingomar, Montana, was built in 1914.  It was listed on the National Register of Historic Places in 1994.

It is Western Commercial in style.

It was built as a bank building but was converted to a bar by 1948.  It has been known as the Ingomar State Bank, the First National Bank of Ingomar, the Oasis Bar, and the Jersey Lilly Bar & Cafe.

The building is a tall one-story brick building with a partial basement. The southern part  portion of the building was built in 1914.

References

Bank buildings on the National Register of Historic Places in Montana
National Register of Historic Places in Rosebud County, Montana
Buildings and structures completed in 1914
1914 establishments in Montana